Kerwad may refer to:

 Kerwad (H), a village in Karnataka, India
 Kerwad (Gundyanati), a village in Karnataka, India